Styl życia G'N.O.J.A is an album by rapper Peja. Double album (90 minutes) contains 22 tracks, over which the artist worked from 2006 to 2008. The official premiere took place on 6 December. On December 8, the album was certified gold. In April 2011 the album was certified platinum. The album features several fellow rappers: Charlie P (alter ego), Kaczor, Bigus, Sandra, Four (Czwórka), Brahu and PTP.

Track listing 
 CD 1
"SZG Intro" - 1:22
"Szkoła życia" / "School of Life" (feat. Kaczor) - 4:59
"Bragga" (feat. Charlie P) - 4:05
"Muza trzyma mnie przy życiu" / "Music is What Keeps Me Alive" - 3:46
"Definicja pener" / "The Definition of Pener" - 4:34
"Gruba impra z Rysiem" / "A Big Party with Richie" (feat. Biguś) - 3:36
"To Pe Do En (Jestem stąd)" / "It's Poznań (I'm from there)" (feat. Sandra) - 4:02
"Na dnie..." / "At the Bottom..." - 4:32
"Rap moją kokainą" / "Rap is My Cocaine" - 3:51
"Moralniak" / "Moral Hangover" - 3:14
"Regulamin zabijania" / "Rules of Killing" (feat. Czwórka) - 4:59

 CD 2
"Ta chwila…" / "This Moment" (feat. Sandra) - 3:33
"Zmieni się na lepsze…" / "It Will Change for Better" - 4:32
"Ja Pierdolę" / "Fucking Hell", or lit. "I'm Fucking" (feat. RDW & Brahu) - 4:28
"Getto (Stylowe rymy)" / "Getto (Stylish Rhymes)" - 4:16
"Staszica Story Czwórka" / "Staszica Story Four" - 4:07
"Tak bardzo chcę" / "I Want So Much" [much acts here as an adverb] (feat. Charlie P) - 4:00
"Dziś wyjdziesz ze mną" / "Today/tonight you're going out with me" - 4:42
"(Z)robię szmal" / "I (will) make money" (feat. PTP) - 4:39
"De najsłodsza w mieście" / "De sweetest one in the city" - 3:17
"All Inclusive" - 3:46
"Definicja pener (Remix Czwórka)" - 4:54

References 

Peja (rapper) albums
2008 albums